Hatillo is the tenth district of the San José canton, in the San José province of Costa Rica.

Geography 
Hatillo has an area of  km² and an elevation of  metres.

It adjoins Alajuelita Canton to the south, Mata Redonda and Hospital districts to the north and San Sebastián District to the east.

Demographics 

For the 2011 census, Hatillo had a population of  inhabitants.

Locations
Hatillo District includes the "barrios" (or neighbourhoods) of 15 de Setiembre, 25 de Julio, Hatillo1, Hatillo 2, Hatillo3, Hatillo 4, Hatillo 5, Hatillo 6, Hatillo 7, Hatillo 8, Hatillo Centro, Los Aserrines, Sagrada Familia, Tiribí, Topacio and Vivienda en Marcha.

Transportation

Road transportation 
The district is covered by the following road routes:
 National Route 39
 National Route 110
 National Route 176
 National Route 177

References

External links
Municipalidad de San José. Distrito Hatillo – Website of San Jose Mayor, includes a map of the district and related info.

Districts of San José Province
Populated places in San José Province